A junk shop is a retail outlet similar to a thrift store which sells mostly used goods at cheap prices. A low-quality antique shop may border on being a junk shop. Shoppers who frequent junk shops are often referred to as "junkers", "pickers", "bargain hunters", "rummagers", etc.

Pop culture

Reality television
Junk shops are often showcased in such reality television shows as American Pickers, Canadian Pickers (known as Cash Cowboys outside of Canada), and Ghost Town Gold.

Junkshop glam
Junkshop glam (less commonly referred to as junk shop glam) is a nuanced music genre term coined in the early 2000s by former Buzzcocks bassist, Tony Barber, and Lush bassist, Phil King. Junkshop glam describes the nearly forgotten vinyl records of 1970s glam rock bands whose unsuccessful records had limited release, virtually no airplay, and have thus been relegated to the cheap record bins and often overlooked record stacks found in junk shops, charity shops, thrift stores, and the like. With the resurging interest in vinyl records, such obscure glam rock records can command high prices among avid record collectors and even band members themselves looking to fill missing releases in their own discographies.

See also
 Bric-a-brac
 Car boot sale
 Charity shop
 Flea market
 Thrift store

References

External links
 "junk shops", The best of New York 
  UK Junk Shops portfolio  "'junk shops'". by Philip Woolway

Retailers by type of merchandise sold
Antiques
Reuse